Tragedy (German: Tragödie) is a 1925 German silent drama film directed by Carl Froelich and starring Walter Janssen, Henny Porten and Annemarie Winkler.

The film's sets were designed by the art director Franz Schroedter.

Cast
 Walter Janssen as Graf Tamar 
 Henny Porten as Gräfin Maria Tamar 
 Annemarie Winkler as Komtesse Monica, beider Töchterchen 
 Lina Lossen as Komtesse Antonie Tamar, Schwester des Grafen 
 Robert Scholz as Jean Guiscard, Dichter 
 Robert Garrison as Pickart, Verleger 
 Eberhard Leithoff as Erik Lindholm, ein Schreiber 
 Jaro Fürth

References

Bibliography
 Bock, Hans-Michael & Bergfelder, Tim. The Concise CineGraph. Encyclopedia of German Cinema. Berghahn Books, 2009.

External links

1925 films
Films of the Weimar Republic
Films directed by Carl Froelich
German silent feature films
German black-and-white films
1925 drama films
German drama films
Silent drama films
1920s German films
1920s German-language films